Pratul may refer to–

 Pratul Chandra Ganguli (1884–1957), Indian Bengali revolutionary
 Pratul Mukhopadhyay (born 1942), Bengali singer, creative artist and songwriter

See also 
 Pratulum, a genus of marine bivalve molluscs in the family Cardiidae

Indian masculine given names